Diaphus perspicillatus, the transparent lantern fish, is a species of lanternfish 
found worldwide.

Size

References

Myctophidae
Taxa named by James Douglas Ogilby
Fish described in 1898